Salisbury Street Historic District is a national historic district located at Mocksville, Davie County, North Carolina. The district encompasses 40 contributing buildings in a predominantly residential section of Mocksville. It was developed between the 1820s and World War II and includes notable examples of Greek Revival, Italianate, Queen Anne, and American Craftsman style residential  architecture.  The dwellings are predominantly one- and two-story log and frame houses.  Also in the district is the (former) Mocksville Academy (c. 1828).

It was added to the National Register of Historic Places in 1990.

References

Historic districts on the National Register of Historic Places in North Carolina
Italianate architecture in North Carolina
Greek Revival architecture in North Carolina
Queen Anne architecture in North Carolina
Buildings and structures in Davie County, North Carolina
National Register of Historic Places in Davie County, North Carolina